Pericles was a prominent and influential statesman, orator, and general of Athens during the city's Golden Age.

Pericles or Perikles may also refer to:

 Pericles (ship), a sailing ship launched in 1877
 SS Duncan U. Fletcher, a Liberty ship renamed Pericles in 1947
 SS Pericles, an ocean liner which sank in 1910
 Perikles (name), a list of people with the given name Pericles, Perikles or Periklis
 Pericles, Prince of Tyre, a play by William Shakespeare
 Perikles (band), a Swedish dansband
 Perikles, a board game designed by Martin Wallace
 Péricles de Andrade Maranhão, who signed only as Péricles, was a Brazilian cartoonist and caricaturist
 Péricles (singer), a Brazilian singer

See also
 Pericle, a given name
 Pericles' Funeral Oration, by the Athenian
 Pericles with the Corinthian helmet, a lost statue known from copies
 Project Pericles, a non-profit organization